Lianhua Subdistrict may refer to several subdistricts of China, including:

 , Jilin (city), Jilin (province)
, Shenzhen, Guangdong
, Nanyang, Henan
, Zhoukou, Henan
 Lianhua Subdistrict, Yanjiang District, Ziyang, Sichuan